Juana Samayoa (born 1948) is a Guatemalan-American actress and television presenter. She presented and produced News Talk for KBHK from 1977-1982, and had played host to the heady days of battles over LGBT rights in San Francisco, with interviews with Harvey Milk (months before his assassination) and John Briggs on the Briggs Initiative.

Samayoa has two daughters.

Credits
 Mission Movie (2004, as Antonia)
 Between Places
 Spider-Man: Homecoming

External links
 Website
 
 

1948 births
American actresses
American people of Guatemalan descent
Living people
21st-century American women